Markbreit is a German surname. Notable people with the surname include:

Jerry Markbreit (born 1935), American football referee
Leopold Markbreit (1842–1909), German-American politician

German-language surnames